The 2010–11 season was Stockport County's 100th season in the Football League, and 96th consecutively. However, they eventually finished 24th in Football League Two and were relegated to the Football Conference.

The season began with the club being taken over by the 2015 consortium, following the club being in administration since April 2009. Following the takeover, Gary Ablett left the position of manager and was replaced by Paul Simpson. However, in January Simpson was sacked and was replaced on a part-time basis by assistant Peter Ward. Ward was unable to stop Stockport's slide down the league, and was himself replaced by Ray Mathias who had initially joined the club as a technical adviser to Ward. Results improved under Mathias, picking up 10 points from the final 6 home matches, but it wasn't enough to save the Hatters and relegation was confirmed following a 2–0 defeat to Crewe Alexandra

Stockport lost in the first round of both the League Cup and the FA Cup, losing to Peterborough United and Preston North End respectively.

League table

Results

Pre-season friendlies
Stockport County opted not to name players on trial who played in friendlies, following other clubs chasing Belgian striker Esteban Casagolda after he scored twice in a behind-closed-doors friendly. Hence a number of goals were listed as scored by 'trialist'.

As Edgeley Park is owned by Sale Sharks, problems with the pitch have arisen from having both football and Rugby Union on the same surface. Consequently, Stockport played their 'home' friendly against Inverness Caledonian Thistle at Wincham Park, home of Witton Albion.

Football League Two

FA Cup

Football League Cup

Football League Trophy

Statistics

Appearances

|}

Overall
{|class="wikitable"
|-
| style="width:125px;"| Statistic || style="width:100px;"| Total || style="width:90px;"| League Two || style="width:100px;"| FA Cup || style="width:100px;"| League Cup || style="width:100px;"| League Trophy
|-
|Games played || 50 || 46 || 2 || 1 || 1
|-
|Games won || 9 || 9 || 0 || 0 || 0
|-
|Games drawn || 16 || 14 || 1 || 0 || 1
|-
|Games lost || 25 || 23 || 1 || 1 || 0
|-
|Goals scored || 50 || 48 || 2 || 0 || 0
|-
|Goals conceded || 106 || 96 || 5 || 5 || 0
|-
|Goal difference || -56 || -48 || -3 || -5 || 0
|-
|Clean sheets || 6 || 5 || 0 || 0 || 1
|-
|Yellow cards || 68 || 64 || 3 || 0 || 1
|-
|Red cards || 6 || 6 || 0 || 0 || 0
|-
|Best result(s) || colspan="5" | Won 3–1 v Barnet (A), League Two, 28 December 2010
|-
|Worst result(s) || colspan="5" | Lost 5–0 on four occasions - v Preston North End (H), League Cup, 10 August 2010v Morecambe (A), League Two, 30 October 2010 v Hereford United (H), League Two, 2 November 2010 v Port Vale (H), League Two, 23 November 2010
|-
|Most appearances || colspan="5" |  Adam Griffin - 48 (45 starts, 3 substitute)
|-
|Top scorer || colspan="5" |  Greg Tansey - 10
|-
|Top assists || colspan="5" |  Paul Turnbull - 4  Jake Simpson - 4
|-
|Worst discipline || colspan="5" |  Greg Tansey - 10  0 
|-

References

Stockport County F.C. seasons
Stockport County